Occoquan Regional Park is a regional park along a tributary of the Potomac River, located in Lorton in Fairfax County, Northern Virginia.

It is protected and operated by the NOVA Parks agency of Northern Virginia.

Features
The park has dense forests, preserved Civil War arsenals, and a tributary creek that flows into the Potomac River. At the park's center is a large, beehive brick kiln, the last of what had been as many as eight others that were used during the turn of the last century to produce many of the bricks found in Washington, D.C. and the surrounding area. The bricks were mainly made by prisons of the neighboring Lorton Reformatory, which closed in 2001.

The park also features the Jean R. Packard Center, a large wedding and events facility called the River View, as well as a Brickmakers Cafe. The Packard Center opened in June 2018, and was named after Jean R. Packard, an environmental activist and former chair of the Fairfax County Board of Supervisors, as well as a long time NOVA Parks Board Member. Packard died in 2014.

For sports recreation it has a paved bicycle path, a 5k loop trail, athletic fields, and a public marina.

See also

References

External links 

 NOVA Parks.org: Occoquan Regional Park website

NOVA Parks
Parks in Fairfax County, Virginia
Regional parks in Virginia